Same-sex marriage and civil unions are not legal in Armenia.

The legal status of foreign same-sex marriages is unclear. On 3 July 2017, the Ministry of Justice reportedly stated that all marriages performed abroad are valid in Armenia, including marriages between people of the same sex. Article 143 of the Armenian Family Code states that Armenia recognizes foreign marriages as long as they conform with the legality of the territory where they were performed and contains no explicit prohibition of same-sex marriages. On the other hand, article 152 restricts the application of foreign law norms incompatible with the domestic public order. As of 2023, no instances of foreign same-sex marriage registrations are known. In 2019, Minister of Justice Rustam Badasyan said that the government does not recognize same-sex marriages. The Constitution of Armenia is generally believed to limit marriage to opposite-sex couples, although the Constitutional Court has never confirmed or rejected this interpretation.

Legal history

Background
Same-sex marriage is not legal in Armenia and there is little public debate surrounding the issue. The Government of Armenia has close ties with the Armenian Apostolic Church, which opposes same-sex marriage. Civil unions, which would offer some of the rights of marriage, are also not recognized in Armenia. In August 2019, the Minister of Justice, Rustam Badasyan, stated that Armenia does not recognize same-sex marriages "despite Armenia signing the Istanbul Convention". However, Badasyan also stated that same-sex cohabitation is permitted and that violence against any person is "unacceptable".

In 2006, a same-sex couple celebrated an informal wedding ceremony at the Etchmiadzin Cathedral in Vagharshapat. An article published about this improvised marriage in the "168 Zham" (168 Hours) newspaper provoked a scandal and indignation of local conservative media outlets, politicians and religious officials.

In December 2017, Father Vazken Movsesian, serving in the Diocese of the West of the Apostolic Church, which is based in California, United States, expressed his personal support for same-sex marriage, becoming one of the most high-profile supporters of same-sex marriage in the church. In an interview with Equality Armenia, Movsesian likened the historic persecution of Armenians by Turkey to the persecution faced by LGBT people. "We've been persecuted because we were not accepted, because we were different. As an Armenian Christian, how can I possibly close my eyes to what's going on in the world? And it's not just in Armenia, just everywhere, this intolerance.", he said.

Legal restrictions
Article 10 of the Family Code, adopted in 2004, states that marriage requires "the mutual voluntary consent of a man and a woman". On 18 October 2017, Deputy Tigran Urikhanyan of the Prosperous Armenia party proposed a bill to introduce a more explicit ban on same-sex marriages in the Family Code. On 15 November 2018, the Armenian Government expressed its opposition to the bill, stating that the Family Code already prevents the recognition of same-sex marriages. "Armenia's Constitution already defines that marriage is possible only between woman and man. Besides, according to Family Code marriage is possible in case of reciprocal consent of a man and a woman and in case they are 18 years old [sic]", said the Ministry of Labor and Social Affairs. The National Assembly rejected the bill in November 2019, labelling it "redundant", while also rejecting a bill which would have explicitly banned adoption by same-sex couples.

Article 11 of the Family Code, which lists several outlawed marriages (including bigamy, marriages between close relatives and marriages between adopters and adopted), does not contain explicit prohibitions on marriages between people of the same sex.

Constitutional amendment (2015)
The Constitution of Armenia was amended in a constitutional referendum in 2015 to read:

"Article 35. Freedom to Marry
1. A woman and a man having attained the marriageable age shall have the right to marry and form a family with free expression of their will. The marriageable age and the procedure for marriage and divorce shall be prescribed by law. 
2. A woman and a man are entitled to equal rights as to marriage, during marriage and at its dissolution.
3. Freedom to marry may be restricted only by law with the aim of protecting health and morals."

Many politicians have stated that the constitutional wording bans same-sex marriage. On the other hand, members of the Venice Commission, when analyzing the draft constitution, said that the wording "should not be interpreted as a legal obstacle to the recognition of same-sex marriages". Argam Stepanyan, the head of the Civil Status Acts Registration Agency, a division of the Ministry of Justice, later said in an interview that there is no constitutional prohibition on same-sex marriage in Armenia. Several politicians and human rights activists have said that the wording "notes" the right of a man and a woman to marry, but does not explicitly state that marriage is a between a man and a woman.

Recognition of marriages performed abroad
On 3 July 2017, the Ministry of Justice reportedly stated that all marriages performed abroad are valid in Armenia, including marriages between people of the same sex. According to the Family Code, marriages between Armenian citizens and those between Armenian citizens and foreigners or stateless persons, which have been registered outside Armenia, are valid inside the country after consular legalization. The code makes no reference to the sexes of the married spouses and stipulates that marriages registered in another country, which are in line with that particular state's legislation, are valid in Armenia as long as they are also compliant with the Armenian public order. As of 2023, the Statistical Committee of Armenia has not documented a single case of recognition of a foreign same-sex marriage. It is not known if recognition would give such couples all the rights of marriage under domestic law.

Public opinion
A 2017 poll from the Pew Research Center showed that 91% of Armenians favored the Apostolic Church's position of not performing same-sex marriages, while 4% disagreed.

See also

 Human rights in Armenia
 LGBT rights in Armenia
 Pink Armenia
 Recognition of same-sex unions in Europe
 Recognition of same-sex unions in Asia
 Right Side NGO

Notes

References

LGBT rights in Armenia
Armenia
Armenia